International Civil Engineering Symposium (ICES) is an annual technical fest by SCALE (School of Civil and Chemical Engineering) of the Vellore Institute of Technology. It is a symposium usually held during the month of March every year. ICES organized by ASCE-VIT (in collaboration with the American Society of Civil Engineers India section) of  VIT University  is one of the biggest gathering of Civil Engineers from all over India and abroad. This symposium has been organised twice by the student chapter. For the first time, in its second edition the symposium hosted an International Conference on Sustainable Energy and Built Environment which proved to be very successful, with presentation of more than 150 research papers by national and international delegates. During the symposium several workshops are conducted in association with external agencies like Bentley, Dr. vivis institution, Civil simplified, Archipedia and Aimil.

Board Members 2017 - 18

Board Members 2020 - 21

American Society of Civil Engineers - VIT Student Chapter
American Society of Civil Engineers, a world student organization has recognized ASCE-VIT as an official student chapter. This chapter was issued by Region 10 Board of Governors which grants ASCE-VIT all rights and privileges given in the Constitution by the laws of the Society. ASCE-VIT is a student chapter in VIT University Vellore, dedicated towards achieving perfection and inspiring minds in the field of Civil Engineering. It is a team of 75 hardworking students who are persistent in their efforts to organize events, guest lectures, industrial visits and conferences to shape up innovations and research in Civil Engineering. ASCE-VIT has been successfully organizing one of the largest civil engineering symposiums of the country- Structura'13, ICES'14, ICES'15 and is now back with its 4th edition ICES'16.

Present frontier
After three successful ventures  ICES’14, ICES’15 and ICES'16 ASCE-VIT is now coming up with the 4th edition of the International Civil Engineering Symposium.

Previous ventures
ASCE-VIT has successfully organised symposiums over the four consecutive years.

ICES'16
The 2nd International Conference on Sustainable Energy and Built Environment was held from 10–12 March, it was a global platform initiated to inspire innovation to address rising challenges of environmental, economic and social sustainability. The objective of the theme was to invite ideas on the foundations of strong research to improve our practices and policies, national as well as international for sustainable development in energy and built environment. Also to give an opportunity to meet brilliant minds from India and abroad who are committed towards building a better tomorrow.
The themes of the conference included transportation engineering, building materials and structural engineering, geotechnical engineering, environmental engineering, water resources engineering and advances in civil engineering.

Paper presentation
Students, academicians, professionals, scientists from R&D organizations, professionals from government and public sector undertakings were invited to contribute papers. It was also an opportunity to publish one's work in the International Journal of Science and Technology (Anna University Annexe).

Green Ideation
An international competition named Green Ideation, which aimed to take a step towards searching innovative ideas for creating a sustainable built environment, was conducted. Every team had to come up with an idea and had to showcase it into a working or a scale model of the same.

Workshops

1. Water gems
WaterGEMS provided users with a comprehensive yet easy-to-use decision-support tool for water distribution network. This workshop gave the participants a brief idea on how infrastructure behaves as a system, how it reacts to operational strategies, and how it should grow as

2. Microstation
Microstation was a platform for architectural and engineering software package developed by Bentley systems,a CAD software for two and three dimensional design and drafting. MicroStation provides the versatility to precisely view, model, document and visualise any information rich project of different size and complexity. It is also capable of generating 2D and 3D vector graphics, objects and elements. With MicroStation one can detect and resolve clashes, and perform an analysis of real-world solar exposure and shading.

3. Seismic Design
The primary objective of the workshop was to theoretically as well as practically train participants about the design and analysis software used for developing earthquake resistant structures using earthquake simulation techniques. This workshop was conducted by experienced professionals from 'Civil Simplified' in the field of Earthquake Engineering.

4.Primavera
The need for resource and project management software has turned up sig PRIMAVERA workshop provided an in depth project planning training  held by the experienced professionals from Dr Vivis Institution assuring you an excellent working knowledge and exposure enhancing your background concept of planning and scheduling.

5. Green Building Design
This workshop taught how to tackle the challenges of modernization. It was a chance to learn from the best in the business and be a part of this revolution. Green building design aims to reduce the environmental impact of building. It brings together a vast array of practices, techniques, and skills to reduce and ultimately eliminate the impacts of buildings on the environment and human health.

6. Geospatial Technology
Geospatial technology is an umbrella phrase associated with a suite of technologies including Remote Sensing (RS), Global Positioning System (GPS), Geographic Information System (GIS), information technologies and field sensors that help in capturing/ storing/ processing/ displaying/ disseminating information tied to a particular location.

7.Transportation Engineering
Transportation engineering dealt with the basics of travel demand modelling, activity based travel modelling and advanced tools like intelligent transportation system (ITS).The  workshop provided in depth understanding of transport planning, traffic engineering and pavement design and ITS.

ICES'15
ICES'15 was all over a huge success. It was inaugurated by Dr. Robert D. Stevens (International President ASCE 2014-15), Thomas W. Smith (Executive Director Designate) from ASCE Headquarter, Virginia and Dr. G L Sivakumar Babu, Governor, Region 10, ASCE.
International Conference on Sustainable Energy and Built Environment was held under the mandate of International Civil Engineering Symposium 2015. The conference was held on 12 & 13 March 2015, at VIT University, Vellore. The researchers, professors and scholars were the potential delegates. The  ASCE-VIT  team received around 235 papers for the Conference. The papers were segregated under various categories.
The poster presentation took place on the second day, 13 March 2015. The posters were reviewed by the panel consisting of professors from Department of Civil Engineering, VIT University, Vellore.

Workshops

1. Open Source Geospatial
There were theoretical as well as practical sessions, teaching the participants the importance, background, latest techniques, industrial approach and various aspects regarding Geospatial Engineering, emphasizing the session on mainly the software like QGRASS.

2. Terrestrial Laser Techniques for Civil Engineering
In this workshop, students were taught to use the terrestrial laser equipment for a duration Of 8 hours. During the workshop the smallest and lightest laser scanner on the market - Focus3D X 330 was used for surveying.

3.Advance Surveying
The students were taught the operation of advanced instruments like Total Station and their uses on construction site. They were taken for a live demonstration of the instruments and were taught to measure the elevation of various buildings surrounding the area contouring the area, leveling of roadways etc.

4.Bridge Design and Fabrication
It was conducted in association with Civil Simplified on the 13,14 March 2015. It was a theory session in which students were taught about various types of bridges the forces acting upon them, strength measurements and fabrication materials and besides this, software such as SAP 2000 and AUTOCAD were also distributed.

5.Tall Building Design
The workshop was conducted by Civil Simplified. The first session was theoretical based. The participants were made to understand the technical concepts involved in the designing and construction of Tall Buildings, with the help of various case studies, they were made to understand the implication of tall building design in the real world and how each tall building has different conditions to be met. From the next session onwards, practical learning took place on the software. The students worked hands-on on analyzing and designing a tall building using a CAS based software, SAP2000

6.Advances in Transportation Engineering
The first session was about Advances in Urban Transport Planning and Travel Demand Modeling Approaches, useful industrial applications were explained to the participants. The second session was about Application of GIS and GPS for Effective Traffic Data Collection and Analysis. The lucid explanation of the topics cheered all the students up and all of them left the hall with something to remember. The final session was a talk about Application of Advanced Tools such as ITS for Efficient Traffic Management

7.Non-Destructive Testing
The workshop was conducted  by the leading instrumentation firm AIMIL Ltd. The practical sessions were mainly undertaken by the experienced trainers of AIMIL followed by theoretical sessions with latest state-of-the-art equipment like Concrete Test Hammers, Ultrasonic Pulse Tester, Rebar Locator, Corrosion Tester, Pile Testing Apparatus, Structure Mini (Ground Penetrating Radar).

8.Advanced Concrete Technology
The main focus was given on the basic components in the production of concrete and how different varieties can be obtained using different composition ratios of these materials. Also, to make the students understand better, different cement and concrete samples were kept for display.

9.Air Quality Monitoring Through Receptor Modelling
In the first session, the participants were told about the concepts of air quality management and various methods for monitoring air quality. In the second session, the participants learnt about source apportionment and receptor modeling. The next two sessions were practical-based in which the participants were given hands-on demo on application of chemical mass balance receptor model in source apportionment and application of positive matrix factorization model in source apportionment.

10.Environmental Quality Monitoring
The aim of the workshop was to impart knowledge regarding different aspects of environmental pollution: the different pollutants harming the environment, the ways to monitor the environment and our contribution towards protecting it.

11.Design of Structures Using ETABS
The workshop was conducted in collaboration With Dr. Vivis Institutions. ETABS is a program for linear, nonlinear, static and dynamic analysis, and the design of building systems. Being the next milestone in the field of structural programming. In the first session, the students were taught the basics Of ETABS. This was done using the ETABS 2013 and the usage of its tools was instructed. The second session, in which the trainers helped the students with the software implementation and also cleared their problems regarding the software. In the last session, the participants were taught the advanced tools of ETABS.

United Civil Engineering Summit (UCES)
A summit involves discussion of various topics and dealt with protocols Similar to a 
Model United Nations conference. The delegates are allotted different countries, they are expected to be familiar with the foreign policy of the Country. The agendas at hand are put to a vote and one agenda is picked according to unanimous decision of the delegates. The agendas are then discussed between the delegates in detail throughout the session. A resolution is formed at the end of the final Session. There were  intense sessions where the delegates representing different nations took to discuss the problems of their assigned nations due to rapid urbanization, overpopulation and the remedies to the problem steered by the expertise of the experienced panel of the chair, vice chair and the director.. The resolution passed after the unmoderated caucus supported the majority of the council with the hope of this successful execution

ICES'14
ICES'14 Was the first edition of International Civil Engineering Symposium. Even though it was the first edition it turned out to be a huge success. It was a 3-day journey that provided the students with abundant knowledge and working techniques in the different fields of civil engineering. The conference conducted during the symposium received papers from all over the nation and several other countries. The overwhelming response was the source of inspiration for ASCE-VIT to conduct international conference. Along with the paper presentation many workshops were also there which were conducted by reputed firms like Civil Simplified and faculties of VIT University. ICES'14 witnessed a number of successful workshops like:
 Bridge Design and Fabrication
 Seismic Design
 Primavera
 Midas Gen
 Disaster Response and Preparedness
 Construction Surveying
 Geospatial Technology
 Fundamentals and Advances in Transport Planning and Traffic Engineering
 Geotechnical Earthquake Engineering
 Water Resources. 
Along with this many notable events like United Civil Engineering Summit (UCES) were conducted, which attracted a huge gathering.

International Conference on Sustainable Energy and Built Environment

ICES'14 witnessed countless creative and state-of-the-art ideas. In order to take these ideas on another level, ASCE-VIT planned to conduct conference in ICES 15. The goal of this conference was to bring together innovative academics and industrial experts in the field of civil engineering to a common forum, promote research and developmental activities. Thus ASCE-VIT in collaboration with School Of Mechanical And Building Sciences-VIT, has conducted a conference, which covered fields like: water treatment, hydrological processes in natural and urban environment, soil and ground water remediation, water reuse, contemporary water quality issues, hydrology in the field Of water resources. Environmental engineering forms an important field in civil, thus themes like alternative energy and their environmental impacts, environmental biotechnology, Biotransformation and fate of environmental contaminants, Air quality: air pollution, Energy and environmental impacts Of infrastructure systems, Sustainable transportation planning, Sustainable environment, Reliability and risk analysis, pollutant transport and contaminant Transport Modeling were included. An interesting and relatively new field, information technology in construction has also been included, thus encouraging progressive Civil stream positions itself on central subjects like structural, earthquake, and geotechnical and transport engineering, and hence included in the conference. 
International Conference on Sustainable Energy and Built Environment was held under the mandate of International Civil Engineering Symposium 2015. The conference was held on 12 & 13 March 2015 at VIT University, Vellore. The conference witnessed tremendous success and created a benchmark to be taken further. The conference was a culminated result of months of hard work that took place in different phases. The initiation Of the entire event was marked by inviting around 300 colleges for the research papers. All the eminent colleges across the nation and few across the international boundaries were contacted through their respective Department Of Civil Engineering. The researchers, professors and scholars were the potential delegates. Besides the academic institutes, many professional civil engineering firms were contacted for the same. In response, over research papers were received. All the papers were segregated under various categories- Structural, Geotechnical, Environmental, Transportation, Water Resources, Miscellaneous. This was followed by the selection procedure of the papers. The papers were selected by the panel of elite professors from the Department of Civil Engineering, VIT University, Vellore. It was commenced with the releasing of the conference proceedings by our guests Dr. Robert Stevans, Mr. Thomas W. Smith and Dr. G L Sivakumar Babu.
The poster presentation took place on the second day of the conference. After peer review by the judging panel, 57 papers were recommended for being published in the International Journal of Earth Sciences and Engineering.

Sponsors and media

ICES receives extensive coverage in online media. ICES has attracted sponsorships from various corporations from cep (civil engineering portal), fests.info and twenty19 as its media partner. In terms of industrial association and sponsorship, ICES receives sponsorship from Larsen and Toubro, Kingsway Consultants, Aimil Limited, Concord Instruments Pvt. Ltd., Indian Oil, Indus Instruments, Sapscon, Toyota. ICES has very encouraging and supportive sponsors.

References

External links
 http://www.asceis-ices.com/ - Official website
 https://www.facebook.com/ices14/?fref=ts - Facebook Page

Vellore Institute of Technology
Technical festivals in India